Platybrissus is a genus of echinoderms belonging to the family Eurypatagidae.

The species of this genus are found in Malesia.

Species:

Platybrissus ellipticus 
Platybrissus parvus 
Platybrissus roemeri

References

Spatangoida
Echinoidea genera